11 teams competed in the 1960 or 1961 season of the Cameroonian Premier League. Oryx Douala won the championship.

Participants
 Union Yaoundé
 Diamant Yaoundé
 Dragon Yaoundé
 Caiman Douala
 Vent Lolanne Douala
 Oryx Douala
 Aigle Nkongsamba
 Aigle Dchang
 Etoile Abong-Nbang
 Epervier Ebolowa
 Colombe anmélima

References

1961 in Cameroonian football
Cam
Cam
Elite One seasons